This list of university statistical consulting centers (or centres)  is a simple list of universities in which there is a specifically designated team providing statistical consultancy services. Often this service will be available only to enquirers from within the same university.

Australia

Belgium

Canada

Germany

Hungary

Indonesia

Spain

United States

The following is a list of university statistical consulting centers in the United States of America.

Vietnam

See also 
Statistical consultant
Statistician

References

External links 
 Statistical Consulting Centers at other Universities USA centres other than  Michigan State University
 statistical consulting services
 What is statistical consulting?

Consulting
Statistical service organizations
Statistics-related lists